Haapasaari (Finnish for aspen island) may refer to:

 Aspö, an island and a village in Korpo, Finland
 Haapasaari (Kotka), a former municipality and an island near Kotka, Finland